Mission BBQ (stylized as MISSION BBQ) is an American barbecue restaurant chain based in Glen Burnie, Maryland. Bill Kraus and Steve Newton opened the first location on September 11, 2011, as a way to support military, police, firefighters, and first responders.

History and ownership
Bill Kraus, a former apparel executive (Under Armour), and Steve "Newt" Newton, a former restaurant executive (Outback Steakhouse), started with the concept of supporting military and public response forces, and then decided to go into the barbecue industry. After doing some market research throughout the United States, they opened the first Mission BBQ in Glen Burnie, Maryland on the tenth anniversary of the September 11, 2001 terror attacks.

They opened another Mission BBQ in Perry Hall, Maryland the following year before recording growth numbers of three new restaurants in 2013, nine in 2014 and 2015, and 17 in 2016. Growth spiked sharply post-2017, with the company planning an expansion strategy of 20 to 25 new locations a year, all privately owned and financed through M&T Bank and Goldman Sachs.

Operations and management

Mission BBQ also caters. Mission BBQ Catering Maryland, LLC was founded in 2012. The company's line of business includes the retail sale of prepared foods and drinks for on-premise consumption. The company has a large catering facility next to the first Mission BBQ restaurant in Glen Burnie. Each location offers additional catering options.

References

External links
 

Restaurant chains in the United States
Barbecue restaurants in the United States
Restaurants established in 2011
American companies established in 2011
2011 establishments in Maryland
Companies based in Anne Arundel County, Maryland
Glen Burnie, Maryland